Hakim Imtiyaz Hussain  (حكيم امتياز حسين)(born 16 July 1949) is a former judge of the Jammu and Kashmir High Court and was a former member of the State Accountability Commission. He also served  as Chairman, Fee Fixation Committee for private schools in the State of Jammu and Kashmir.

List of books written by Justice Hakim Imtiyaz Hussain
 Muslim Law and Customs
 Agrarian Reforms Act with Comments & Case Law.
 Kashmir mein Zari Islahat (Urdu)
 
 Service Law in Jammu and Kashmir
 
 Financial Rules and Regulations
 Pay Rules Made Easy
 
 Land Laws in Jammu and Kashmir
 
 Supreme Court and High Court Judges Conditions of Service

 The Shias of Jammu and Kashmir

 Tareekh e Shaiyan Jammu wa Kashmir (Urdu)
 Azadari Hazrat Imam Hussain (Urdu)

References

People from Jammu and Kashmir
20th-century Indian judges
Living people
Judges of the Jammu and Kashmir High Court
1949 births